Alfredo Roque Gameiro (4 April 1864, Minde - 15 August 1935, Lisbon) was a Portuguese painter and graphic artist who specialized in watercolors.

Biography 

Alfredo Roque Gameiro was born in Minde, Portugal. When he was ten years old, he went to live in Lisbon with his oldest brother, Justin, who owned a lithography studio. He studied at the "Faculty of Fine Arts" of the University of Lisbon, where  was one of his professors. 
After receiving a scholarship from the Portuguese government, he attended the "Hochschule für Grafik und Buchkunst" in Leipzig and studied lithography with Ludwig Nieper (1826-1906). Upon returning to Portugal in 1886, he became the Director of the  "Companhia Nacional Editora" and, in 1894, was appointed a Professor at the "Escola Industrial do Príncipe Real".

He was a frequent contributor to several weekly and monthly periodicals and worked with Manuel de Macedo (1839-1915) to provide illustrations for a deluxe edition of The Lusiads, published in 1900. From 1910 to 1920 he created 10 watercolors and 90 lithographs for what would be his most popular work, Lisboa Velha (Old Lisbon), with an introduction by the poet . He also illustrated several popular novels by Júlio Dinis. In 1919, he became the first Director of the "Escola de Arte Aplicada de Lisboa", a position he held until 1930. The following year, he and his daughter Helena had a successful joint exhibition in Brazil. He was elected a member of the Real Academia de Bellas Artes de San Fernando in 1923.

Three institutions bear his name: the "Escola Roque Gameiro" in Amadora (where he lived for many years), the "Casa Roque Gameiro" (his home, partly designed by Raul Lino; now an exhibition space) and the "Centro de Artes e Ofícios Roque Gameiro" in his hometown, which includes a museum devoted to watercolors. A majority of his works are on display at the municipal museum there, including many on loan from the Gulbenkian Foundation. Some of his designs appear on Portuguese postage stamps.
All five of his children became artists:
 
Raquel Roque Gameiro Ottolini (1889-1970), also a watercolorist, 
 (1890-1944), who worked with diverse materials.
Helena Roque Gameiro (1895-1986), a landscape painter who married the film director José Leitão de Barros,
 (1901-1996), oil and watercolor painter; married to painter Jaime Martins Barata
Ruy Roque Gameiro (1907-1935), a sculptor who, despite his short life, is the best-known. His sculptures may be seen in Portugal and Mozambique.

Works

Quadros da História de Portugal

Lisboa Velha, 1925

História de Portugal Popular e Ilustrada

References

Further reading
 Maria Lucília Abreu, Roque Gameiro: o homem e a obra (the man and his work), ACD Edições, 2005, 
 Thereza Leitão de Barros, Exposição retrospectiva da obra de Roque Gameiro, Lisbon, 1946.

External links

"A Tribo dos Pincéis" a book issued on the occasion of a conference held at his home in Amadora (2013). It includes his postage stamp designs and book illustrations by his entire family.
"A Tribo dos Pincéis" a website devoted to Roque Gameiro and his family.
Biographies and critical material compiled @ jcabral.info

1864 births
1935 deaths
People from Alcanena
Portuguese history painters
Portuguese watercolourists
Portuguese lithographers
Portuguese illustrators
19th-century Portuguese painters
Portuguese male painters
19th-century male artists
20th-century Portuguese painters
20th-century male artists
19th-century lithographers 
20th-century lithographers
Hochschule für Grafik und Buchkunst Leipzig alumni